Frank Patterson (1938–2000) was an Irish tenor.

Frank Patterson may also refer to:
 Frank Patterson (American football) (1873–1939), American football coach
 Frank Patterson (illustrator) (1871–1952), English illustrator of cycling 
 Frank Harris Patterson (1890–1976), judge and historian in Nova Scotia Canada
 Frank Jefferson Patterson, co-founder of National Cash Register, brother of John H. Patterson
 Frank N. Patterson Jr. (1917–1971), politician in North Carolina
 Frank Porter Patterson (died 1938), physician and politician in British Columbia, Canada
 Frank Stuart Patterson (1897–1918), Army Air Corp test pilot, son of Frank Jefferson Patterson

See also
 Frank Paterson (fl. 1930s), surveyor and mayor in Australia
 Francis Patterson (disambiguation)